"Look at Them Beans" is a song written by Joe Tex. Johnny Cash recorded and released it as a single in 1975 and subsequently included on that year's album Look at Them Beans.

Track listing

Charts

References

External links 
 "Look at Them Beans" on the Johnny Cash official website

Johnny Cash songs
1975 songs
1975 singles
Songs written by Johnny Cash
Columbia Records singles